Qarqar or Karkar most commonly refers to Qarqar, an ancient city in Syria. They may also refer to:

 Qarqar, Azerbaijan, a village
Karkar Island, Papua New Guinea
Qarqarçay, a river in Azerbaijan
Karkar, Selseleh, a village in Iran
Boubacar Traoré, a Malian musician nicknamed "Kar Kar"

See also
Gargar (disambiguation)
Korkor (disambiguation)